The Vayenga is a river in Murmansk Oblast, Russia. Of length 25 km, it flows into the Vayenga Bay of the Kola Bay, Barents Sea.

The town of Severomorsk (formerly Vayenga) is located by the Vayenga Bay.

References

Rivers of Murmansk Oblast
Drainage basins of the Barents Sea